Kingston railway station is in Kingston upon Thames in south-west London. The station and all trains serving it are operated by South Western Railway. It is in Travelcard Zone 6.

History
The station opened on 1 July 1863 as "Kingston Town", to distinguish it from the earlier Kingston station (which became ) on the South West Main Line. The platforms built when the line was prolonged in 1869 to connect to the South West Main Line were named "Kingston High Level".

The Southern Railway rebuilt and unified the station in 1935. In August 2010 it was refurbished, with the entrance, but not the concourse, moving a few metres to face Wood Street instead of being at the corner formed by Wood Street and Richmond Road, and the independent shop was replaced by a WHSmith and a Costa Coffee shop.

In common with the 16 hourly off-peak closer commuter services to/from London Waterloo calling at Earlsfield railway station (more during peak) and all intermediate London stations all managed by South Western Railway, trains must stop at every intermediate station.  There are no fast services available to mid distance destinations, which gives overcapacity towards the more suburban termini due to the longer journey time and overcrowding during the inner city phase of journeys. This situation can be contrasted to certain other routes to destinations just outside Greater London in certain other directions. However, due to its location on the Kingston Loop Line, passengers can also travel from Kingston to London via Twickenham.

Ticket barriers are in operation.

The station is currently in TfL Fare Zone 6, but there is an ongoing campaign for it to be rezoned to Zone 5.

Station layout
The two northern platforms are on the through tracks while the third, at the south, is a long west-facing bay which has been used for past curtailments of the Shepperton service and allows for reversal of trains coming via  on Sundays or when there is a closure east of Kingston of either the loop or the main line. Stairs and lifts give access to the platforms.

Services
The typical off-peak weekday service at Kingston in trains per hour is:
 6 to Waterloo, of which:
 4 run via Wimbledon
 2 run via Richmond and Twickenham
 2 to 

On Sundays, there are hourly services to Waterloo via Wimbledon & via Richmond and along the branch to Shepperton.  An additional hourly service to Waterloo via the Hounslow Loop Line (calling at all intermediate stations) starts/terminates here.

Connections
No buses stop at the station entrance, but Cromwell Road and Fairfield bus stations are less than two and five minutes walk away respectively.

References

External links

Railway stations in the Royal Borough of Kingston upon Thames
Former London and South Western Railway stations
Railway stations in Great Britain opened in 1863
Railway stations served by South Western Railway
DfT Category C1 stations